Éder Armando Morales Cortés (born 20 April 1983 in Morelia, Michoacán) is a Mexican former professional footballer who played as a defender.

References

External links
 

1983 births
Living people
Footballers from Michoacán
Mexican footballers
Sportspeople from Morelia
Association football defenders
Atlético Morelia players
Ascenso MX players
Venados F.C. players
Club Celaya footballers
Alebrijes de Oaxaca players
Cafetaleros de Chiapas footballers